Loch of Craiglush is a freshwater loch, located around  north-east of Dunkeld in Perth and Kinross, Scotland. The loch is a designated Site of Special Scientific Interest (SSSI), as well as forming part of a Special Area of Conservation.

Fishing
Loch of Craiglush, Loch of the Lowes, Loch of Butterstone, Loch of Clunie, Loch of Drumellie, Loch Rae, Fingask Loch, Loch White and Loch Black and the Stormont Loch form a series of lochs all draining into the Lunan Burn, which flows into the River Isla before its junction with the River Tay. All these rivers contain pike and perch and trout are taken in Lochs Craiglush, Lowes and Butterstone.

References 

Craiglush
Protected areas of Perth and Kinross
Sites of Special Scientific Interest in Scotland
Special Areas of Conservation in Scotland
Tay catchment